The synthetic control method is a statistical method used to evaluate the effect of an intervention in comparative case studies. It involves the construction of a weighted combination of groups used as controls, to which the treatment group is compared. This comparison is used to estimate what would have happened to the treatment group if it had not received the treatment.
Unlike difference in differences approaches, this method can account for the effects of confounders changing over time, by weighting the control group to better match the treatment group before the intervention. Another advantage of the synthetic control method is that it allows researchers to systematically select comparison groups. It has been applied to the fields of political science, health policy, criminology, and economics.

The synthetic control method combines elements from matching and difference-in-differences techniques. Difference-in-differences methods are often-used policy evaluation tools that estimate the effect of an intervention at an aggregate level (e.g. state, country, age group etc.) by averaging over a set of unaffected units. Famous examples include studies of the employment effects of a raise in the minimum wage in New Jersey fast food restaurants by comparing them to fast food restaurants just across the border in Philadelphia that were unaffected by a minimum wage raise, and studies that look at crime rates in southern cities to evaluate the impact of the Mariel boat lift on crime.  The control group in this specific scenario can be interpreted as a weighted average, where some units effectively receive zero weight while others get an equal, non-zero weight.

The synthetic control method tries to offer a more systematic way to assign weights to the control group. It typically uses a relatively long time series of the outcome prior to the intervention and estimates weights in such a way that the control group mirrors the treatment group as closely as possible. In particular, assume we have J observations over T time periods where the relevant treatment occurs at time  where  Let

 
be the treatment effect for unit  at time , where  is the outcome in absence of the treatment. We aim to estimate .

Imposing some structure

and assuming there exist some optimal weights  such that

 
So under some regularity conditions, such weights would provide estimators for the treatment effects of interest. In essence, the method uses the idea of matching and using the training data pre-intervention to set up the weights and hence a relevant control post-intervention.

Synthetic controls have been used in a number of empirical applications, ranging from studies examining natural catastrophes and growth, studies that examine the effect of vaccine mandates on childhood immunisation, and studies linking political murders to house prices.

See also 

 Difference in difference
 Regression discontinuity
 Instrumental variables estimation

References

Design of experiments
Statistical methods
Observational study
Econometric modeling